Stadium ŠKP Inter Dúbravka is a football stadium in Dúbravka, Slovakia and is the home stadium of the FK Inter Bratislava and FK ŠKP Inter Dúbravka Bratislava. FK Inter Bratislava  started playing at the stadium in Summer 2014. Stadium capacity is 5000, including 250 VIP seats. Stadium is currently used by most successful American football team in Slovakia - Bratislava Monarchs.

References

Stadium website 

FK Inter Bratislava
Football venues in Slovakia
Sports venues completed in 1976
American football venues in Europe
1976 establishments in Czechoslovakia